Seikwa is a town located in Tain District, in Bono region (formerly Brong Ahafo),  Ghana. As of 2010, Seikwa had a population of 9,166, consisting of 4,149 males and 5,017 females. The town is served by the Nkoranman Senior Secondary School.

References

Populated places in the Brong-Ahafo Region
Populated places in the Bono Region